Fu Yu (born 29 November 1978) is a Chinese-born Portuguese table tennis player. She competed at the 2016 Summer Olympics in the women's singles event, in which she was eliminated in the second round by Nanthana Komwong.

References

1978 births
Living people
Table tennis players from Hebei
Chinese emigrants to Portugal
Portuguese female table tennis players
Chinese female table tennis players
Olympic table tennis players of Portugal
Naturalised table tennis players
European Games medalists in table tennis
Table tennis players at the 2019 European Games
European Games gold medalists for Portugal
Table tennis players at the 2020 Summer Olympics